Adeline Lobdell was born 1887 in Chicago, Illinois. Lobdell married Henry Atwater, and the couple had two daughters. The family moved to Washington, D.C., where Adeline became active in the National Women's Party as the representative for Illinois. Following World War I, Lobdell was granted a divorce in Reno, Nevada, and moved to New York City, New York, where she became the art director of the New Gallery. She then became a writer, composing both fiction such as The Marriage of Don Quixote and non-fiction such as Autobiography of an Extrovert. In 1932, Lobdell remarried to Harold C. Pynchon. Her writing career flourished and she garnered attention for her short stories in New York Magazine, New York Herald Tribune, and The Midwest Review of Literature.
Adeline Atwater Pynchon died in 1975.

External links
 Adeline Lobdell Atwater Papers at Newberry Library

1887 births
1975 deaths
Writers from Chicago
Writers from New York City